Climb Dance is a famous cinéma vérité short film, which features Finnish rally driver Ari Vatanen setting a record time in the highly modified four-wheel drive, all-wheel steering Peugeot 405 Turbo 16 at the 1988 Pikes Peak International Hillclimb in Colorado, United States. The film was produced by Peugeot and directed by Jean Louis Mourey. The record time set was 10:47.77.

In 2013 Peugeot commissioned a remastered HD version of film in celebration of their entry in the 2013 Pikes Peak International Hill Climb with multiple WRC champion Sébastien Loeb.

Awards
 Grand Prix Du Film in Festival De Chamonix, 1990
 Silver Screen at US Industrial Film & Video Festival Chicago, 1990
 Prix Special Du Jury at the Festival International Du Film D'Aventure Val D´Isere, 1990
 Golden Award at the International Film Festival Houston, 1990

References

External links
 

1989 films
1989 short films
American auto racing films
Documentary films about auto racing
1980s short documentary films
Pikes Peak
Films shot in Colorado
1989 documentary films
1980s American films